Bradbourne is a civil parish in the Derbyshire Dales district of Derbyshire, England.  The parish contains 16 listed buildings that are recorded in the National Heritage List for England.  Of these, one is listed at Grade I, the highest of the three grades, one is at Grade II*, the middle grade, and the others are at Grade II, the lowest grade.  The parish contains the village of Bradbourne and the surrounding countryside.  The listed buildings consist of houses, cottages and associated structures, farmhouses and farm buildings, a church and items in the churchyard, and a former watermill and associated buildings.


Key

Buildings

References

Citations

Sources

 

Lists of listed buildings in Derbyshire